NAVCO Business Security Services, formerly North American Video Corporation, is a security system integrator in Anaheim, California. NAVCO has a dispatch center in Alpharetta, Georgia.

History
NAVCO was founded in 1971 by Mike Parker, originally as New England Video Corporation in Parker's home in Chelmsford, Massachusetts. The company expanded to New York and Minneapolis, as well as Tampa in the early years and to allay customer confusion, these other Parker owned entities were incorporated as North American Video Corporation in 1974. Offices followed in San Francisco, Los Angeles, St. Louis, Hartford, New Jersey, Akron and other places. In 1981, Parker was forced out by Wickes Companies, who had acceded to a 51% stock option held by the former Gamble Skogmo Company of Minneapolis, in April 1981. Two years later in 1983, Richard and Margaret Groves purchased the company. By 1984, the company had expanded its services and adopted the acronym NAVCO as its official moniker.

In 1999, NAVCO purchased American Cabling and Communications (AC&C), a company specializing in structured cable and network communications. Later, in 2006, AC&C began the process of changing its name to NAVCO Network Systems.

NAVCO currently has 12 offices in the United States, with Bill Groves as CEO and Jim Kauker as president.

See also
Closed-circuit television
Surveillance

References

External links
Official website
Perspectives on leadership

Security companies of the United States
Companies based in California
1971 establishments in California